OMG I MADE IT (stylized in upper-case) is the second EP released by the American musician pronoun (aka Alyse Vellturo).

Content
The five track EP was released on vinyl, digital download, and on streaming services on 11 June 2021. Like her previous EP and album, OMG I MADE IT was recorded in Vellturo's Brooklyn, NY apartment. Vellturo describes the album as "a five song memoir from a 33 y/o queer business woman navigating her way through mental health and anxiety." The first two singles, I WANNA DIE BUT I CAN'T (CUZ I GOTTA KEEP LIVING) and I'M RIGHT BACK IN IT were written sometime in late 2019 before the 2020 pandemic. The remaining songs were written after the pandemic started, but were not directly related to what was happening. Vellturo realized the album was finished once she wrote WASTING TIME and realized it was the last song.

The song I WANNA DIE BUT I CAN'T (CUZ I GOTTA KEEP LIVING) was written after a bad day at work. On the song, Vellturo says:

Reception

The lead single, ″I WANNA DIE BUT I CAN’T (CUZ I GOTTA KEEP LIVING)″ received positive press from Stereogum, MTV, and Billboard, where it landed the 44th spot in their June article ″The 50 Best Songs of 2021 So Far: Staff Picks″ and 98th on Billboard's top 100 songs of 2021 where it was described "as both a scream-along anthem about stunted emotional growth, and proof as to why Pronoun leader Alyse Vellturo needs to be playing bigger stages"

Track listing

Note
 All tracks are stylized in upper-case. Spelling mistake on SOUND THE ALARMS!!!1! is intentional

References

2021 EPs
Self-released EPs